Muhammad Rafiq, Brig., was the Commandant of Military College Jhelum (1952–53, 1955–59). In his times the name of the institution changed from King George Royal Indian Military School to Military College Jhelum. A biography of him, Kirdar Saz, was written by Saeed Rashid

Life
Education at Victoria High School Kuala Lumpur
Method officer Pakistan Military Academy
Commandant Military College Jhelum
Commanding Officer 19 Punjab Regiment and Operation in Bajaur Agency
1965 Pakistan-India War
Governor's Inspection Team and Mujibur Rahman's trial
Principal Lawrence College Ghora Gali
Last years

References

External links
 Military College Jhelum stie
 Laurance College history page

Pakistani educational theorists
Pakistani educators